Inspection of Emigrants Convention, 1926 (shelved) is  an International Labour Organization Convention.

It was established in 1926:
Having decided upon the adoption of certain proposals with regard to the simplification of the inspection of emigrants on board ship, ...

Ratifications
Prior to its being shelved, the convention had been ratified by 33 states.

External links 
Text.
Ratifications.

Migrant workers
Shelved International Labour Organization conventions
Treaties concluded in 1926
Treaties entered into force in 1927
Admiralty law treaties
Health treaties